Daniel Bejar (born October 4, 1972) is a Canadian singer and musician from Vancouver, British Columbia. He is the frontman of Destroyer, and is a member of indie rock band the New Pornographers.

Overview 
In 2006, he joined with Carey Mercer of Frog Eyes and Spencer Krug of Sunset Rubdown and Wolf Parade as part of indie supergroup Swan Lake. He has also collaborated with his wife Sydney Hermant as the duo Hello, Blue Roses, whose debut album was released in 2008.

Personal life 
Bejar was born in 1972 to a Spanish father and an American mother at Vancouver General Hospital. Bejar's father was a physicist who grew up in Spain during the Francoist dictatorship and his mother was a teacher who taught the Spanish language. His father died when he was 13 years old. Growing up Bejar moved frequently and in adulthood has resided in Southern California, Canada and Spain. Bejar attended University of British Columbia for three years: "To my credit, I eventually dropped out; to my discredit, I waited three years to do it. I was taking mostly English and Philosophy classes, fooling myself into thinking I might be an academic." He has one daughter and currently lives in the Strathcona neighbourhood of Vancouver with her and Hermant.

In the late 1990s, Bejar had an acting role in his future New Pornographers bandmate Blaine Thurier's microbudget film Low Self-Esteem Girl.

Miscellaneous 

In March 2010, an article in The New Yorker touched on visual artist Dan Bejar's elaborate efforts at impersonating the singer of the same name, resulting in confusion and numerous errors in coverage by the media.

Discography

References

External links 
Destroyer at Merge Records
Destroyer at Misra Records
The Ratio – Destroyer Special Issue
*sixeyes Interview – Destroyer's Dan Bejar Interview
 Dan Bejar's 'Other' Band NPR segment aired March 18, 2006

1972 births
Living people
Canadian people of Spanish descent
Canadian singer-songwriters
Canadian indie rock musicians
Musicians from Vancouver
The New Pornographers members
Spanish-language singers of Canada
21st-century Canadian male singers
Merge Records artists
University of British Columbia alumni
Canadian male singer-songwriters
Canadian people of Jewish descent